Golden Pennies is an Australian-British television series which screened in 1985 on ABC and ITV. The series starring Carol Drinkwater and Bryan Marshall, The eight part series followed the adventures an English family who travel to Australia to seek their fortune in the Victorian goldfields in the 1850s.

It was executive produced by Christopher Muir, written by Graeme Farmer and directed by Oscar Whitbread.

References

External links
Golden Pennies at IMDb
Golden Pennies at Australian Television

British adventure television series
1985 British television series debuts
1986 British television series endings
Australian adventure television series
1985 Australian television series debuts
1986 Australian television series endings
Australian children's television series
Television shows set in colonial Australia